The Howe o'Buchan House is a Category C listed building on Inverugie Road in Peterhead, Aberdeenshire, Scotland. It dates from 1840 (although an inscription of unknown origin above a door gives a date of 1711), and is a two-storey residential building. The house contains a marble chimneypiece that dates from circa 1805.  It also contains a sculptured panel and bannisters which originated from Brucklay Castle.

By 1853 Howe o'Buchan was the home of Thomas Walker, one of four brothers whose family had originated at Waulkmill and Bankhead in New Aberdour who between them owned the neighbouring estates of Richmond, Balmore, Grange, and Howe o'Buchan. When the railway station opened in Peterhead, the water needed for the engines was pumped from Howe o'Buchan.

Gallery

See also
List of listed buildings in Peterhead, Aberdeenshire

References

Category C listed buildings in Aberdeenshire
Listed buildings in Peterhead
1840 establishments in Scotland